Persicula bandera is a species of sea snail, a marine gastropod mollusk, in the family Cystiscidae.

References

bandera
Gastropods described in 1965
Cystiscidae